Theiddat (1375/76–1408) was the heir-presumptive of Ava from 1400 to 1406 during the reign of King Minkhaung I of Ava. Theiddat was the key figure in securing his elder brother Minkhaung I's claim on the throne of Ava. In the early days of Minkhaung's reign, Theiddat personally led an army to put down a major rebellion. After Minkhaung named his eldest son Minye Kyawswa heir apparent in 1406, Theiddat felt betrayed, and fled south in 1407 and joined the service of King Razadarit of Hanthawaddy Pegu, which was amidst fighting the Forty Years' War (1385–1424) with Ava.

It turned out that Theiddat could not betray his brother. In 1408, Theiddat, who was with a special group of Hanthawaddy forces who were waiting to ambush Minkhaung, gave a warning to his brother at a critical moment, allowing him to escape. Theiddat was duly executed by Razadarit for his warning.

Early life
Minkhaung and Theiddat were sons of King Swa Saw Ke by Saw Beza whom he had met during one of his military campaigns. As their mother was a commoner, they were not in line for the throne. Swa had designated Prince Tarabya as crown prince.

Minkhaung's accession
In April 1400, their father died and Tarabya ascended the throne. In November 1400, Tarabya was assassinated by Nga Nauk Hsan, the governor of Tagaung who tried to seize the throne. The ministers put the usurper to death, and gave the throne to Minkhaung. His ascension was greeted by a major rebellion led by Gov. Maha Pyauk of Yamethin. Pyauk marched to Ava with a force of 10,000 men, 60 attack elephants and 800 horses. Theiddat led Ava's defenses, and defeated the stronger rebel force, killing Maha Pyauk. In gratitude, Minkhaung gave Theiddat Sagaing to rule but stopped short of declaring him heir-apparent. The younger brother was never satisfied with the reward he received for his help, and held a lingering resentment that would rear its ugly head later.

Single combat with Minkhaung
In 1406, Minkhaung named his eldest son Minye Kyawswa as heir apparent. His brother Theiddat, who had loyally supported Minkhaung in time of his need, felt betrayed, and challenged Minkhaung to an elephant-to-elephant single combat. Minkhaung defeated his younger brother but allowed him to leave. Theiddat took refuge in Razadarit's service. Razadarit welcomed Theiddat and gave him his sister in marriage.

Foiling of Minkhaung's assassination and death
In May 1408, Minkhaung invaded the south and reached the outskirts of Pegu. Razadarit tried to break the siege by sending special forces to assassinate Minkhaung. Minkhaung escaped death on the warning by his brother Theiddat who was with Pegu troops to ambush him. Theiddat was later executed by Razadarit for his warning.

Notes

References

Bibliography
 
 
 
 
 

Ava dynasty
1408 deaths
1375 births
Non-inheriting heirs presumptive